Supplementary data for aluminium chloride.

External MSDS 
 Baker
 Fisher
 EM Science
 Akzo Nobel (hexahydrate)
 Science Stuff (hexahydrate)
 External SDS

Thermodynamic properties

Spectral data

Structure and properties data

References 
NIST website

Chemical data pages
Chemical data pages cleanup